Victoria Lower Glacier is a glacier occupying the lower eastern end of Victoria Valley where it appears to merge with Wilson Piedmont Glacier. It was named by the Victoria University of the Wellington Antarctic Expedition (1958–59) for their Alma Mater, which sponsored the expedition.

Glaciers of Victoria Land
McMurdo Dry Valleys